Kanan-e Olya (also Romanized as Kan‘ān-e ‘Olyā; also known as Kan‘ān-e Īl) is a village in Dul Rural District, in the Central District of Urmia County, West Azerbaijan Province, Iran. At the 2006 census, its population was 156, in 40 families.

References 

Populated places in Urmia County